Preston McGann is an American football wide receiver for the Orlando Rage. He played college baseball at Seminole Community College and attended Groves High School in Garden City, Georgia. He has also been a member of the Columbus Lions and Pittsburgh Power. McGann appeared on Michael Irvin's reality show 4th and Long.

Early years
McGann played high school baseball for the Groves High School Fighting Scottish Rebels. He did not play football in high school.

College career
McGann played college baseball for the Seminole Community College Raiders from 2005 to 2006.

Professional career

Orlando Rage
McGann played for the semi-pro Orlando Rage from 2006 to 2009, earning 2008 Southern States Football MVP honors as the team won two league championships.

4th and Long
McGann was the second cut on Michael Irvin's reality show 4th and Long.

Columbus Lions
McGann signed with the Columbus Lions of the Southern Indoor Football League in December 2009 and played for the team during the 2010 season.

Orlando Rage
McGann returned to the Orlando Rage, earning FFA All Star honors in 2011 after recording 31 receptions for 720 yards and 11 touchdowns during the regular season. He has played for the Rage each season since 2011.

Pittsburgh Power
McGann played in two games for the Pittsburgh Power in 2012, recording a reception and two tackles. He joined the Power for the first game of the 2012 season due to some of the regular players holding out due to disagreements between the AFL and the AFL Player's Union. In a game between the Power and the Orlando Predators, several former and current Orlando Rage players, including McGann, were assigned to either the Power or the Predators during an impromptu draft.

References

External links
Just Sports Stats

Living people
Year of birth missing (living people)
Baseball players from Georgia (U.S. state)
Players of American football from Georgia (U.S. state)
American football wide receivers
Seminole State Raiders baseball players
Columbus Lions players
Pittsburgh Power players
People from Chatham County, Georgia